The Liber Seregni Front was the name of the centre-left faction inside the Frente Amplio which was created by Danilo Astori leader of Uruguay Assembly, Rafael Michelini leader of New Space and Rodolfo Nin Novoa, leader of Progressive Alliance, in August 2009, before the election. The group takes its name from Liber Seregni, founder of the Frente Amplio.

General election, 2009 
In this election the FLS obtained five seats in the Senate taken by Ramón Fonticiella, Rafael Michelini, Rodolfo Nin Novoa, Carlos Baráibar and Susana Dalmás.

External links 
  (in Spanish)
 

Broad Front (Uruguay)
Political party factions in Uruguay
Social democratic parties in Uruguay